Robert McNair may refer to:

Bob McNair (1937–2018), American businessman, owner of the Houston Texans team in the National Football League
Robert Evander McNair (1923–2007), American politician, governor of South Carolina
Robert McNair or Buck McNair (1919–1971), Canadian Second World War flying ace